Quentin Crisp (born Denis Charles Pratt;  – ) was an English raconteur, whose work in the public eye included a memoir of his life and various media appearances. Before becoming well-known, he was an artist's model, hence the title of his most famous work, The Naked Civil Servant. He afterwards became a gay icon due to his flamboyant personality, fashion sense and wit. His iconic status was occasionally controversial, due to remarks about subjects like the AIDS crisis. This invited censure from gay activists, including human-rights campaigner Peter Tatchell.

During his teen years, he worked briefly as a rent boy. He then spent thirty years as a professional model for life-classes in art colleges. The interviews he gave about his unusual life attracted great curiosity, and he was soon sought after for his personal views on social manners and the cultivation of style.

His one-man stage show was a long-running hit both in Britain and America, and he also appeared in films and on television. Crisp defied convention by criticising both gay liberation and Diana, Princess of Wales.

Despite considering himself a gay man for most of his life, just before his death, Crisp wrote in an autobiography that it had been "explained" to him that he was "not really homosexual", but was transgender.

Biography

Early life 
Denis Charles Pratt was born in Sutton, Surrey, on 25 December 1908, the fourth child of solicitor Spencer Charles Pratt (1871–1931) and former governess Frances Marion Pratt (née Phillips; 1873–1960). His elder siblings were Katherine (1901–1976), Gerald (1902–1983) and Lewis (1907–1968). He changed his name to Quentin Crisp in his twenties after leaving home, and expressed a feminine appearance to a degree that shocked contemporary Londoners and provoked gay-bashing assaults.

By his own account, Crisp was "effeminate" from an early age, resulting in his being teased while at Kingswood House School in Epsom, Surrey, from which he won a scholarship to Denstone College, Uttoxeter, Staffordshire, in 1922. After leaving school in 1926, Crisp studied journalism at King's College London, but failed to graduate in 1928, going on to take art classes at the Regent Street Polytechnic.

Around this time, Crisp began visiting the cafés of Soho – his favourite being The Black Cat in Old Compton Street – meeting other young gay men and rent-boys, and experimenting with make-up and women's clothes. For six months, he worked as a prostitute; in a 1998 interview, he said he was looking for love, but found only degradation, a reflection he had previously expressed in the 1968 World in Action interview, which aired on television in 1971.

Crisp left home to move to the centre of London at the end of 1930, and after dwelling in a succession of flats, found a bed-sitting room in Denbigh Street, Pimlico, where he "held court with London's brightest and roughest characters." His 'outlandish' appearance – he wore bright make-up, dyed his long hair crimson, painted his fingernails and wore sandals to display his painted toe-nails – brought admiration and curiosity from some quarters, but generally attracted hostility and violence from strangers passing him in the streets.

Middle years
Crisp attempted to join the British army at the outbreak of the Second World War, but was rejected and declared exempt by the medical board on the grounds that he was "suffering from sexual perversion". He remained in London during the 1941 Blitz, stocked up on cosmetics, purchased five pounds of henna and later paraded through the streets during the black-out, picking up G.I.s. In 1940, he moved into a first-floor flat at 129 Beaufort Street, Chelsea, a bed-sitting room that he occupied until he emigrated to the United States in 1981. In the intervening years, he never attempted any housework, writing famously in his memoir The Naked Civil Servant: "After the first four years the dirt doesn't get any worse."

Crisp left his job as an engineer's tracer in 1942 to become a model in life classes in London and the Home Counties. Crisp wanted to call his book I Reign in Hell, a reference to Milton's Paradise Lost ("Better to reign in Hell, than serve in Heaven"). Crisp's agent insisted on The Naked Civil Servant, an insistence that later gave him pause when he offered the manuscript to Tom Maschler of Jonathan Cape on the same day that Desmond Morris delivered The Naked Ape. The Naked Civil Servant  was published in 1968 to generally good reviews, although it initially only sold 3,500 copies. Crisp was then approached by the documentary film maker Denis Mitchell to be the subject of a 1968 short film in which he discussed his life and lifestyle. The documentary aired on British television in 1971.

Fame

In 1975, the television version of The Naked Civil Servant was broadcast on British and US television, making actor John Hurt and Crisp into stars. This success launched Crisp in a new direction: that of performer and tutor. He devised a one-man show and began touring the country with it. The first half of the show was an entertaining monologue loosely based on his memoirs, while the second half was a question-and-answer session with Crisp picking the audience's written questions at random and answering them in an amusing manner.

After the success of the film, his autobiography was reprinted; Gay News commented that it should have been published posthumously (Crisp said that this was their polite way of telling him to drop dead). Gay rights campaigner Peter Tatchell said he had met Crisp in 1974, and alleged that he was not sympathetic to the Gay Liberation movement of the time. Tatchell said Crisp asked him: "What do you want liberation from? What is there to be proud of? I don't believe in rights for homosexuals."

By now Crisp was a theatre-filling humorist; in 1978, his one-man show sold out London's Duke of York's Theatre. He then took the show to New York. His first stay in the Hotel Chelsea coincided with a fire, a robbery, and the death of Nancy Spungen. Crisp decided to move to New York permanently and, in 1981, found a small apartment at 46 East 3rd Street in Manhattan's East Village.

As he had done in London, Crisp allowed his telephone number to be listed in the telephone directory. He saw it as his duty to converse with anyone who called him, saying "If you don't have your name in the phone book, you're stuck with your friends. How will you ever enlarge your horizons?" He answered the phone with the phrase: "Yes, Lord?", or "Oh yes?", in a querulous tone of voice. His openness to strangers extended to accepting dinner invitations from almost anyone. Whilst he expected that the host would pay for dinner, Crisp did his best to "sing for his supper" by regaling his host with wonderful stories and yarns, much as he did in his theatrical performances.

Crisp continued to perform his one-man show, published books on the importance of contemporary manners as a means of social inclusion (as opposed to etiquette, which he claimed is socially exclusive), and supported himself by accepting social invitations, and writing film reviews and columns for UK and US magazines and newspapers. He said that provided one could exist on peanuts and champagne, one could quite easily live by going to every cocktail party, premiere and first night to which one was invited.

Crisp also acted on television and in films. He made his debut as a film actor in the Royal College of Art's low-budget production of Hamlet (1976). Crisp played Polonius in the 65-minute adaptation of Shakespeare's play, supported by Helen Mirren, who doubled as Ophelia and Gertrude. He appeared in the 1985 film The Bride, which brought him into contact with Sting, who played the lead role of Baron Frankenstein and, in 1987, wrote the song "Englishman in New York" for Crisp. Crisp also appeared on the television show The Equalizer in the 1987 episode "First Light", and as the narrator of director Richard Kwietniowski's short film Ballad of Reading Gaol (1988), based on the poem by Oscar Wilde. Four years later, he was cast in a lead role, and got top billing, in the low-budget independent film Topsy and Bunker: The Cat Killers, playing the door-man of a flea-bag hotel in a run-down neighbourhood, quite like the one he lived in. Director Thomas Massengale reportedly said that Crisp was a delight to work with.

The 1990s would prove to be his most prolific decade as an actor, as more and more directors offered him roles. In 1992 he was persuaded by Sally Potter to play Elizabeth I in the film Orlando. Although he found the role taxing, he won acclaim for a dignified and touching performance. Crisp next had an uncredited cameo in the 1993 AIDS drama Philadelphia. Crisp accepted some other small bit parts and cameos, such as a pageant judge in 1995's To Wong Foo, Thanks for Everything! Julie Newmar. Crisp's last role was in an independent film, American Mod (1999), while his last full-feature film was HomoHeights (also released as Happy Heights, 1996). He was chosen by Channel 4 to deliver the first Alternative Christmas Speech, a counterpoint to the Queen's Christmas speech, in 1993.

Last years
Crisp remained fiercely independent and unpredictable into old age. He caused controversy and confusion in the gay community by jokingly calling AIDS "a fad", and homosexuality "a terrible disease". He was continually in demand from journalists requiring a sound-bite, and throughout the 1990s his commentary was sought on any number of topics.

Crisp was a stern critic of Diana, Princess of Wales, and her attempts to gain public sympathy following her divorce from Prince Charles. He stated: "I always thought Diana was such trash and got what she deserved. She was Lady Diana before she was Princess Diana so she knew the racket. She knew that royal marriages have nothing to do with love. You marry a man and you stand beside him on public occasions and you wave and for that you never have a financial worry until the day you die." Following her death in 1997, he commented that it was perhaps her "fast and shallow" lifestyle that led to her demise: "She could have been  – and she was swanning about Paris with Arabs. What disgraceful behaviour! Going about saying she wanted to be the queen of hearts. The vulgarity of it is so overpowering."

In 1995 he was among the many people interviewed for The Celluloid Closet, a historical documentary addressing how Hollywood films have depicted homosexuality. In his third volume of memoirs, Resident Alien, published in the same year, Crisp stated that he was close to the end of his life, though he continued to make public appearances, and in June of that year he was one of the guest entertainers at the second Pride Scotland festival in Glasgow.

In 1997 Crisp was crowned king of the Beaux-Arts Ball run by the Beaux Arts Society. He presided alongside Queen Audrey Kargere, Prince George Bettinger and Princess Annette Hunt.

In December 1998 he celebrated his ninetieth birthday, performing the opening night of his one-man show, An Evening with Quentin Crisp, at The Intar Theatre on Forty-Second Street in New York City (produced by John Glines of The Glines organisation).

At the age of 90 Crisp wrote that he had "accepted" that he was transgender. In The Last Word, published posthumously, Crisp wrote, "Having labeled myself homosexual and having been labeled as such by the wider world, I have effectively lived a 'gay' life for most of my years. Consequently, I can relate to gay men because I have more or less been one for so long in spite of my actual fate being that of a woman trapped in a man's body. I refer to myself as homosexual without thinking because of how I have lived my life. If you are reading this and are gay, think of me as one of your own even though you now know the truth. If it's confusing for you, think how confusing it has been for me these past ninety years."

Death
Crisp died of a heart attack on 21 November 1999, nearly one month before his 91st birthday, while staying at the home of a friend in Chorlton-cum-Hardy, Manchester, on the eve of a nationwide revival of his one-man show. A humorous pact he had made with Penny Arcade to live to be a century old, with a decade off for good behaviour, proved prophetic. He was cremated with a minimum of ceremony as he had requested, and his ashes were flown back to his personal assistant and travel companion Phillip Ward in New York.

He bequeathed his rights in three books to his respective collaborators: Phillip Ward for Crisp's final book The Last Word and the book And One More Thing (formerly titled Dusty Answers); Guy Kettelhack for The Wit and Wisdom of Quentin Crisp and John Hofsess for Manners from Heaven. He bequeathed all future UK-only income (but not the copyrights, which belong to Ward, literary agent Stedman Mays, writer Mary Tahan and are managed by Ward) from his remaining literary estate (including The Naked Civil Servant) to the two men he considered to have had the greatest influence on his career: Richard Gollner, his long-time agent and his first agent Donald Carroll.

Posthumous works
In the two years before his death (1997–1999), Crisp had been compiling a work that was initially to be titled The Dusty Answers with Phillip Ward. Crisp and Ward developed material for this book through many hours of recorded interviews, which was necessary because Crisp had lost the use of his left hand and was unable to use a typewriter or computer. The resulting manuscript remained unpublished for eighteen years after Crisp's death, because Ward found it emotionally difficult to transcribe Crisp's words. A chance meeting with Laurence Watts, who interviewed Ward for Pink News, led to a partnership that would see them co-edit Crisp's remaining work. 
 
On 21 November 2017, MB Books published The Last Word: An Autobiography by Crisp, edited by Ward and Watts. Whereas The Naked Civil Servant made Crisp famous and How To Become A Virgin detailed that fame, and his life in New York, The Last Word was written as a goodbye to the world, with Crisp knowing the end was near. In it he recounts several previously untold stories from his life, walks the reader through his journey from obscurity, and reflects on his philosophy. He also describes the realisation that he was a trans woman and not a gay man.
 
In January 2019, MB Books published And One More Thing, a companion book to The Last Word: An Autobiography, again edited by Ward and Watts. This book contains material that the editors believed did not fit into The Last Word. In And One More Thing, Crisp primarily shares his views on other people, their lives and their opinions, from flapper girls to Monica Lewinsky, and from the British Royal Family to Walt Disney. Also included are his collected poems, the script for his Alternative Christmas Message, broadcast on Britain's Channel 4 in 1993, and the script of his one-man show An Evening With Quentin Crisp.

Influence and legacy

Sting dedicated his song "Englishman in New York" (1987) to Crisp.  He had jokingly remarked "that he looked forward to receiving his naturalisation papers so that he could commit a crime and not be deported." In late 1986 Sting visited Crisp in his apartment and was told over dinner, and the next three days, what life had been like for a homosexual man in the largely homophobic Great Britain of the 1920s to the 1960s. Sting was both shocked and fascinated and decided to write the song. It includes the lines:

Sting says, "Well, it's partly about me and partly about Quentin. Again, I was looking for a metaphor. Quentin is a hero of mine, someone I know very well. He is gay and he was gay at a time in history when it was dangerous to be so. He had people beating up on him on a daily basis, largely with the consent of the public."

Crisp was the subject of a photographic portrait by Herb Ritts and was also chronicled in Andy Warhol's diaries.

In his 1995 autobiography Take It Like a Man, singer Boy George discusses how he had felt an affinity towards Crisp during his childhood, as they faced similar problems as young homosexual people living in homophobic surroundings.

In 1991, a documentary about Crisp, Resident Alien, was released by Greycat Films. Crisp was then the subject of the play Resident Alien, by Tim Fountain, which starred his friend Bette Bourne. The play opened in 1999 at the Bush Theatre in London; in 2001, it transferred to the New York Theatre Workshop where it won two Obies (for performance and design). In 2002, it won a Herald Angel (Best Actor) at the Edinburgh Festival; subsequent productions have been seen across the US and Australia.

The 1981 synthpop song No G.D.M by German electro band Gina X Performance is dedicated to Crisp. The song The Ballad of Jack Eric Williams (and Other Three-Named Composers) from William Finn's 2003 song-cycle Elegies refers to him.

In 2009 a television sequel to The Naked Civil Servant was broadcast. Entitled An Englishman in New York, the production documented Crisp's later years in Manhattan. Thirty-four years after his first award-winning performance as Crisp, John Hurt returned to play him again. Other co-stars included Denis O'Hare as Phillip Steele (an amalgam character based on Crisp's friends Phillip Ward and Tom Steele), Jonathan Tucker as artist Patrick Angus, Cynthia Nixon as Penny Arcade, and Swoosie Kurtz as Connie Clausen. The production was filmed in New York in August 2008 and completed in London in October 2008. The film was directed by British director Richard Laxton, written by Brian Fillis, produced by Amanda Jenks and made its premiere at the Berlinale (the Berlin International Film Festival) in early February 2009, before being shown on television later that year.

That same year, Crisp's great-nephew, academic and film-maker Adrian Goycoolea, premiered a short documentary, Uncle Denis?, at the 23rd London Lesbian & Gay Film Festival. The film uses interviews with family and previously unseen home movie footage. In collaboration with Crisperanto (The Quentin Crisp Archives) curator Philip Ward, Goycoolea also created an installation entitled 'Personal Effects'  at the 2010 MIX NYC, New York City, which recreated Crisp's New York apartment using his personal effects and included home video footage.

In 2013, with curator Ward, the Museum of Arts and Design in Manhattan staged a three-month retrospective on Crisp, entitled Ladies and Gentlemen, Mr. Quentin Crisp. The retrospective consisted of free screenings of interviews, one man shows, documentaries and other recorded media.

In 2014 Mark Farrelly's solo performance Quentin Crisp: Naked Hope debuted at the Edinburgh Festival, before transferring to the St. James's Theatre in London and subsequently touring. It depicts Crisp at his Chelsea flat in the 1960s and performing his one-man show thirty years later.

In the 2016 Ghostbusters reboot, Bill Murray explicitly based the dress style of his character (Martin Heiss) on Crisp.

In his 2020 autobiography Confess, Rob Halford of Judas Priest identifies Crisp as having been a hero of his. When the then closeted Halford had first seen The Naked Civil Servant in 1975, he had been impressed by the film and Crisp. Halford came out, in an MTV interview, on 4 February 1998. In 1999, Halford attended San Diego Pride with his partner, Thomas. While there, Halford met Crisp, and got a book signed by him ('To Rob, from Quentin'). According to Halford, he continues to treasure the signed book. Halford views himself as a rock version of Crisp, and refers to himself as the "stately homo of heavy metal".

Works
 Lettering for Brush and Pen (1936), Quentin Crisp and A.F. Stuart, Frederick Warne Ltd. Manual on typefaces for advertising. 
 Colour In Display (1938) Quentin Crisp, 131 pp., The Blandford Press. Manual on the use of colour in window displays. 
 All This and Bevin Too (1943) Quentin Crisp, illustrated by Mervyn Peake, Mervyn Peake Society . Parable, in verse, about an unemployed kangaroo.
 The Naked Civil Servant (1968) Quentin Crisp, 222 pp., HarperCollins, . Crisp's account of the first half of his life.
 How to Have a Life Style (1975), Quentin Crisp, 159 pp., Cecil Woolf Publ., .  Essays on charisma and personality.
 Love Made Easy (1977) Quentin Crisp, 154 pp., Duckworth, . Fantastical, semi-autobiographical novel.
 Chog: A Gothic Fable (1979), Quentin Crisp, Methuen, London. Illustrated by Jo Lynch, Magnum (1981).
 How to Become a Virgin (1981) Quentin Crisp, 192 pp., HarperCollins, .  The second instalment of autobiography, describing his experience of the fame that The Naked Civil Servant and its dramatisation brought.
 Doing It With Style (1981) Quentin Crisp, with Donald Carroll, illustrated by Jonathan Hills, 157 pp., Methuen, . A guide to thoughtful and stylish living.
 The Wit and Wisdom of Quentin Crisp (1984) Quentin Crisp, edited by Guy Kettelhack, Harper & Row, 140 pp., . Compilation of Crisp's essays and quotations.
 Manners from Heaven: a divine guide to good behaviour (1984) Quentin Crisp, with John Hofsess, Hutchinson, . Instructions for compassionate living.
 How to Go to the Movies (1988) Quentin Crisp, 224 pp., St. Martin's Press, .  Movie reviews and essays on film.
 Quentin Crisp's Book of Quotations, also published as The Gay and Lesbian Quotation Book: a literary companion (1989) edited by Quentin Crisp, Hale, 185 pp. . Anthology of gay-related quotes.
 Resident Alien: The New York Diaries (1996) Quentin Crisp, 232 pp., HarperCollins, . Diaries and recollections from 1990 to 1994.
 The Last Word: An Autobiography, (2017) Quentin Crisp, edited by Phillip Ward and Laurence Watts, MB Books, 232 pp., . Quentin Crisp's final book, the third and last instalment of his autobiography, written during the last two years of his life.
 And One More Thing, (2019) Quentin Crisp, edited by Phillip Ward and Laurence Watts, MB Books, 193 pp., . A companion book to Quentin Crisp's The Last Word: An Autobiography. Crisp shares his views on other people, their lives and their opinions. Included is the script for Quentin's Alternative Christmas Message, broadcast on Britain's Channel 4 in 1993, the script of his one-man show An Evening With Quentin Crisp and his collected poetry.

Filmography
  Captain Busby: the Even Tenour of Her Ways  - (1967) - with Martina Mayne, as Marcella
 World in Action (documentary) (Broadcast 1971, filmed in 1968) ...himself. Directed by Denis Mitchell.
 The Naked Civil Servant (1975) (introduction)... himself
 Hamlet (1976) .... Polonius
 The Bride.... Dr. Zalhus
 The Equalizer .... Ernie Frick (episode, "First Light") (1987)
 Ballad of Reading Gaol (short) (1988) .... Narrator
 Resident Alien (1990) (autobiography) .... Himself
 Topsy and Bunker: The Cat Killers (1992) .... Pat the Doorman
 Orlando (1992) .... Queen Elizabeth I
 Philadelphia (1993) (uncredited) .... Guest at Party
 Red Ribbons (1994) (Video) .... Horace Nightingale III
 Aunt Fannie (1994) (Video) .... Aunt Fannie
 Natural Born Crazies (1994) .... Narrator
 To Wong Foo, Thanks for Everything! Julie Newmar (1995) .... New York pageant judge
 Taylor Mead Unleashed, (documentary-1996) Himself. Sebastian Piras director
 Little Red Riding Hood (1997) (voice) .... Narrator
 Barriers (1998)
 Famous Again (1998)

Discography
 "An Evening with Quentin Crisp" (2008) .... Cherry Red Records (U.K.) .... Double C.D. featuring live recordings made at Columbia Recording Studios, New York, on 22 February 1979. Also includes a 35-minute interview with Crisp by Morgan Fisher, recorded in June 1980.
 "Miniatures 1 & 2" (2008) .... Cherry Red Records (U.K.) .... Double C.D. of one-minute tracks by many muses, poets, etc. Produced by Morgan Fisher in 1980 (Pt.1) and 2000 (Pt. 2). Crisp's track is titled "Stop the Music for a Minute".

See also
 LGBT culture in New York City
 List of LGBT people from New York City

References

Notes
 Take It Like A Man, Boy George, Sidgwick & Jackson, 490 pages, . Autobiography of Boy George.
 Coming on Strong, Joan Rhodes, Serendipity Books, 2007. Autobiography of strongwoman Joan Rhodes who was an intimate friend of Crisp's for over half a century.
 The Krays and Bette Davis, Patrick Newley, AuthorsOnline Books, 2005. Memoir by showbiz writer Patrick Newley who acted as Crisp's P.A. for some years.

Biographies
 The Stately Homo: a celebration of the life of Quentin Crisp, (2000) edited by Paul Bailey, Bantam, 251 pages, . Collection of interviews and tributes from those who knew Crisp.
 Quentin Crisp, (2002), Tim Fountain, Absolute Press, 192 pages, . Biography by dramatist who knew Crisp in the last few years of his life.
 Quentin & Philip, (2002), Andrew Barrow, Macmillan, 559 pages, . Dual biography of Crisp and his friend Philip O'Connor.
 Quentin Crisp: The Profession of Being'', (2011), Nigel Kelly, McFarland, . Biography of Mr Crisp by Nigel Kelly who runs the www.quentincrisp.info website.

Further reading 
Archival sources
 Robert Patrick. Letters from Quentin Crisp, 1991–1999 (.21 linear feet) are housed at the New York Public Library.
 Donald Carroll letters received from poets, 1959–1969 (.45 cubic feet) are housed Pennsylvania State University Libraries.

External links

 
 World in Action - YouTube - YouTube
 Official site Crisperanto: The Quentin Crisp Archives ~ All Things Quentin Crisp!
 Obituary in the online magazine Salon.com
 Interview from 1997 in Spike Magazine
 One-hour radio interview from 1989 from Bob Claster's Funny Stuff – KCRW Santa Monica
 
 Cherry Red Records, who have released recordings by Quentin
 Interview with Donald Carroll in 1981 by Studs Terkel from the Studs Terkel Radio Archive

 
1908 births
1999 deaths
20th-century English male actors
20th-century English male writers
20th-century English LGBT people
Alumni of King's College London
Alumni of the Regent Street Polytechnic
British socialites
English artists' models
English calligraphers
English designers
English expatriates in the United States
English gay actors
English gay writers
English graphic designers
English male film actors
English male prostitutes
English male stage actors
English male television actors
English LGBT broadcasters
Transgender memoirists
English LGBT writers
People educated at Denstone College
People educated at Kingswood House School
People from Sutton, London
People from the East Village, Manhattan
Writers from Manhattan
Transgender actors
Transgender male models